Arnett-Fullen House also known as the Gingerbread House, is located on 646 Pearl Street in Boulder, Colorado and is on the list of the National Register of Historic Places listings in Boulder County, Colorado since 2009. This house features a mixture of architectural styles and is a two-story, private residency, which is sometimes open to the public.

History 
The house building starting in 1877 and was completed by 1882. Built by Willamette Arnett (1848–1901), heir to Anthony Arnett, one of the founders of the Boulder Land and Trust Company. Arnett-Fullen House featured one of Boulder's earliest indoor bathrooms, central heating, and cold running water systems. The St. Louis, Missouri-based architect, George E. King (1852–1912) designed the house. This house design features a mixture of architectural styles including Gothic Revival, Victorian, Carpenter Gothic, Second Empire, and Italianate styles and featuring farmhouse aesthetics and the use of cast iron throughout.

During the Klondike Gold Rush, Willamette Arnett died in Dawson City. After Arnett's death, the house was then sold. The house was acquired by Hiram Fullen and the Fullen family around 1914, after there were many stories of spirits in the house and hauntings.

Arnett-Fullen House was referenced as a model of a "gingerbread house" in the Marlys Millhiser horror novel, The Mirror (1978).

References 

National Register of Historic Places in Boulder County, Colorado
Buildings and structures in Boulder County, Colorado